The  Sebastian Inlet Bridge  is a high concrete bridge. It spans the Indian River outlet which is also referred to as the Sebastian Inlet. It carries State Road A1A between Indian River County and Brevard County.

The bridge was built by Cleary Brothers Construction Company, West Palm Beach, Florida, and was completed in 1964. A fishing-walking pier is constructed below the bridge and goes out the inlet along the jetty to the Atlantic.

The Legislature of Florida dedicated the bridge to Robert W. Graves in 1965. In 2004 it was dedicated to James H. Pruitt.

The bridge was deemed "structurally deficient" by the FDOT, as a result of Hurricane Dorian. Officials recommended the 55-year-old bridge be repaired within six years as of 2019.

References

Southern '84 Waterway Guide, page 114
Press Journal, Sebastian Bridge, 18 February 1990, p. 21A
Florida Today, Sebastian Inlet Bridge, 19 November 2005, page 1B

External links

Sebastian Inlet Web Cam
Florida State Park
Building Bridges (page 12)

Bridges completed in 1965
Road bridges in Florida
Bridges in Brevard County, Florida
Transportation buildings and structures in Indian River County, Florida
Concrete bridges in the United States
Concrete bridges in Florida